Janie may refer to:

 Janie (given name)
 Janie (1944 film), an American romantic comedy
 Janie (2006 film), a short
Janie, West Virginia, a community in the United States